

International badminton events (Grade 1)
 May 19 – 26: 2019 Sudirman Cup in  Nanning
  defeated , 3–0 in matches played, to win their 11th Sudirman Cup title.
 August 4 – 11: 2019 BWF Seniors World Championships in  Katowice
 For results, click here.
 August 19 – 25: 2019 BWF World Championships in  Basel
 Singles:  Kento Momota (m) /  P. V. Sindhu (f)
 Doubles:  (Mohammad Ahsan & Hendra Setiawan) (m) /  (Mayu Matsumoto & Wakana Nagahara) (f)
 Mixed:  (Zheng Siwei & Huang Yaqiong)
 December 11 – 15: 2019 BWF World Tour Finals in  Guangzhou

Continental badminton events

 February 11 – 17: 2019 Oceania Badminton Championships (Senior, Junior, & Mixed Teams) in  Melbourne
 Senior:
 Singles:  Oscar Guo (m) /  Chen Hsuan-yu (f)
 Doubles:  (Sawan Serasinghe & Eric Vuong) (m) /  (Setyana Mapasa & Gronya Somerville) (f)
 Mixed:  (Simon Leung & Gronya Somerville)
 Junior
 Singles:  Edward Lau (m) /  Shaunna Li (f)
 Doubles:  (Ryan Tong & Jack Wang) (m) /  (Kaitlyn Ea & Angela Yu) (f)
 Mixed:  (Jack Yu & Angela Yu)
 Senior Mixed Team: 1. ; 2. , 3. , 4. 
 Junior Mixed Team: 1. ; 2. , 3. , 4. 
 February 13 – 17: 2019 European Mixed Team Badminton Championships in  Copenhagen
 Champions: , 2. , Semi-final losers:  and 
 February 14 – 17: 2019 Pan Am Mixed Team Badminton Championships in  Lima
 Champions: , 2. , 3. , 4. 
 March 19 – 24: Badminton Asia Mixed Team Championships 2019 in 
 Champions: , 2. , 3/4.  & 
 April 22 – 28: 2019 African Badminton Championships in  Port Harcourt
 Singles:  Anuoluwapo Juwon Opeyor (m) /  Dorcas Ajoke Adesokan (f)
 Doubles:  (Koceila Mammeri & Youcef Sabri Medel) (m) /  (Dorcas Ajoke Adesokan & Uchechukwu Deborah Ukeh) (f)
 Mixed:  (Koceila Mammeri & Linda Mazri)
 Team Champions: 
 April 23 – 28: 2019 Badminton Asia Championships in  Hannan District (Wuhan)
 Singles:  Kento Momota (m) /  Akane Yamaguchi (f)
 Doubles:  (Hiroyuki Endo & Yuta Watanabe) (m) /  (Chen Qingchen & Jia Yifan) (f)
 Mixed:  (Wang Yilyu & Huang Dongping)
 April 25 – 28: 2019 Pan Am Badminton Championships in  Aguascalientes City
 Singles:  Osleni Guerrero (m) /  Michelle Li (f)
 Doubles:  (Jason Ho-shue & Nyl Yakura) (m) /  (Rachel Honderich & Kristen Tsai) (f)
 Mixed:  (Joshua Hurlburt-Yu & Josephine Wu)
 July 16 – 20: 2019 Pan Am Junior Badminton Championships in  Moncton
 Singles:  Brian Yang (m) /  Natalie Chi (f)
 Doubles:  (Jonathan Shou-Zheng Chien & Brian Yang) (m) /  (Crystal Lai & ZHANG Wenyu) (f)
 Mixed:  (Jonathan Shou-Zheng Chien & Crystal Lai)
 July 20 – 28: Badminton Asia Junior Championships 2019 (Individual & Team) in  Suzhou
 Singles:  Kunlavut Vitidsarn (m) /  ZHOU Meng (f)
 Doubles:  (Leo Rolly Carnando & Daniel Marthin) (m) /  (LI Yijing & LUO Xumin) (f)
 Mixed:  (Leo Rolly Carnando & Indah Cahya Sari Jamil)
 Mixed Team:

2019 BWF Season (Grade 2)
 January 8 – December 15: 2019 BWF Season

 Level Two (Super 1000)
 March 5 – 10: 2019 All England Open in  Birmingham
 Singles:  Kento Momota (m) /  Chen Yufei (f)
 Doubles:  (Mohammad Ahsan & Hendra Setiawan) (m) /  (Chen Qingchen & Jia Yifan) (f)
 Mixed:  (Zheng Siwei & Huang Yaqiong)
 July 16 – 21: 2019 Indonesia Open in  Jakarta
 Singles:  Chou Tien-chen (m) /  Akane Yamaguchi (f)
 Doubles:  (Marcus Fernaldi Gideon & Kevin Sanjaya Sukamuljo) (m) /  (Yuki Fukushima & Sayaka Hirota) (f)
 Mixed:  (Zheng Siwei & Huang Yaqiong)
 September 17 – 22: China Open 2019 in  Changzhou
 Singles:  Kento Momota (m) /  Carolina Marín (f)
 Doubles:  (Marcus Fernaldi Gideon & Kevin Sanjaya Sukamuljo) (m) /  (Chen Qingchen & Jia Yifan) (f)
 Mixed:  (Zheng Siwei & Huang Yaqiong)

 Level Three (Super 750)
 April 2 – 7: 2019 Malaysia Open in  Kuala Lumpur
 Singles:  Lin Dan (m) /  Tai Tzu-ying (f)
 Doubles:  (Li Junhui & Liu Yuchen) (m) /  (Chen Qingchen & Jia Yifan) (f)
 Mixed:  (Zheng Siwei & Huang Yaqiong)
 July 23 – 28: Japan Open 2019 in  Tokyo
 Singles:  Kento Momota (m) /  Akane Yamaguchi (f)
 Doubles:  (Marcus Fernaldi Gideon & Kevin Sanjaya Sukamuljo) (m) /  (Kim So-yeong & Kong Hee-yong) (f)
 Mixed:  (Wang Yilyu & Huang Dongping)
 October 15 – 20: 2019 Denmark Open in  Odense
 Singles:  Kento Momota (m) /  Tai Tzu-ying (f)
 Doubles:  (Marcus Fernaldi Gideon & Kevin Sanjaya Sukamuljo) (m) /  (Baek Ha-na & Jung Kyung-eun) (f)
 Mixed:  (Praveen Jordan & Melati Daeva Oktavianti)
 October 22 – 27: 2019 French Open in  Paris
 Singles:  Chen Long (m) /  An Se-young (f)
 Doubles:  (Marcus Fernaldi Gideon & Kevin Sanjaya Sukamuljo) (m) /  (Lee So-hee & Shin Seung-chan) (f)
 Mixed:  (Praveen Jordan & Melati Daeva Oktavianti)
 November 5 – 10: Fuzhou China Open 2019 in  Fuzhou
 Singles:  Kento Momota (m) /  Chen Yufei (f)
 Doubles:  (Marcus Fernaldi Gideon & Kevin Sanjaya Sukamuljo) (m) /  (Yuki Fukushima & Sayaka Hirota) (f)
 Mixed:  (Wang Yilyu & Huang Dongping)

 Level Four (Super 500)
 January 15 – 20: 2019 Malaysia Masters in  Kuala Lumpur
 Singles:  Son Wan-ho (m) /  Ratchanok Intanon (f)
 Doubles:  (Marcus Fernaldi Gideon & Kevin Sanjaya Sukamuljo) (m) /  (Yuki Fukushima & Sayaka Hirota) (f)
 Mixed:  (Yuta Watanabe & Arisa Higashino)
 January 22 – 27: 2019 Indonesia Masters in  Jakarta
 Singles:  Anders Antonsen (m) /  Saina Nehwal (f)
 Doubles:  (Marcus Fernaldi Gideon & Kevin Sanjaya Sukamuljo) (m) /  (Misaki Matsutomo & Ayaka Takahashi) (f)
 Mixed:  (Zheng Siwei & Huang Yaqiong)
 March 26 – 31: 2019 India Open in  New Delhi
 Singles:  Viktor Axelsen (m) /  Ratchanok Intanon (f)
 Doubles:  (Lee Yang & Wang Chi-lin) (m) /  (Greysia Polii & Apriyani Rahayu) (f)
 Mixed:  (Wang Yilyu & Huang Dongping)
 April 9 – 14: 2019 Singapore Open in 
 Singles:  Kento Momota (m) /  Tai Tzu-ying (f)
 Doubles:  (Takeshi Kamura & Keigo Sonoda) (m) /  (Mayu Matsumoto & Wakana Nagahara) (f)
 Mixed:  (Dechapol Puavaranukroh & Sapsiree Taerattanachai)
 July 30 – August 4: 2019 Thailand Open in  Bangkok
 Singles:  Chou Tien-chen (m) /  Chen Yufei (f)
 Doubles:  (Satwiksairaj Rankireddy & Chirag Shetty) (m) /  (Shiho Tanaka & Koharu Yonemoto) (f)
 Mixed:  (Wang Yilyu & Huang Dongping)
 September 24 – 29: 2019 Korea Open in  Seoul
 Singles:  Kento Momota (m) /  He Bingjiao (f)
 Doubles:  (Fajar Alfian & Muhammad Rian Ardianto) (m) /  (Kim So-yeong & Kong Hee-yong) (f)
 Mixed:  (Dechapol Puavaranukroh & Sapsiree Taerattanachai)
 November 12 – 17: Hong Kong Open 2019 in 
 Singles: (m) / (f)
 Doubles: (m) / (f)
 Mixed:

 Level Five (Super 300)
 January 8 – 13: 2019 Thailand Masters in  Bangkok
 Singles:  Loh Kean Yew (m) /  Fitriani (f)
 Doubles:  (Goh V Shem & Tan Wee Kiong) (m) /  (Puttita Supajirakul & Sapsiree Taerattanachai) (f)
 Mixed:  (Chan Peng Soon & Goh Liu Ying)
 February 19 – 24: 2019 Spain Masters in  Barcelona
 Singles:  Viktor Axelsen (m) /  Mia Blichfeldt (f)
 Doubles:  (Lee Yang & Wang Chi-lin) (m) /  (Kim So-yeong & Kong Hee-yong) (f)
 Mixed:  (Seo Seung-jae & Chae Yoo-jung)
 February 26 – March 3: 2019 German Open in  Mülheim
 Singles:  Kento Momota (m) /  Akane Yamaguchi (f)
 Doubles:  (Hiroyuki Endo & Yuta Watanabe) (m) /  (Du Yue & Li Yinhui) (f)
 Mixed:  (Seo Seung-jae & Chae Yoo-jung)
 March 12 – 17: 2019 Swiss Open in  Basel
 Singles:  Shi Yuqi (m) /  Chen Yufei (f)
 Doubles:  (Fajar Alfian & Muhammad Rian Ardianto) (m) /  (Chang Ye-na & Jung Kyung-eun) (f)
 Mixed:  (Mathias Bay-Smidt & Rikke Søby Hansen)
 April 30 – May 5: 2019 New Zealand Open in  Auckland
 Singles:  Jonatan Christie (m) /  An Se-young (f)
 Doubles:  (Mohammad Ahsan & Hendra Setiawan) (m) /  (Kim So-yeong & Kong Hee-yong) (f)
 Mixed:  (Chan Peng Soon & Goh Liu Ying)
 June 4 – 9: 2019 Australian Open in  Sydney
 Singles:  Jonatan Christie (m) /  Chen Yufei (f)
 Doubles:  (Ko Sung-hyun & Shin Baek-cheol) (m) /  (Yuki Fukushima & Sayaka Hirota) (f)
 Mixed:  (Wang Yilyu & Huang Dongping) 
 July 9 – 14: 2019 U.S. Open in  Fullerton
 Singles:  LIN Chun-yi (m) /  Wang Zhiyi (f)
 Doubles:  (Ko Sung-hyun & Shin Baek-cheol) (m) /  (Nami Matsuyama & Chiharu Shida) (f)
 Mixed:  (Lee Jhe-huei & Hsu Ya-ching)
 September 3 – 8: Chinese Taipei Open 2019 in  Taipei
 Singles:  Chou Tien-chen (m) /  Sung Ji-hyun (f)
 Doubles:  (Goh V Shem & Tan Wee Kiong) (m) /  (Jongkolphan Kititharakul & Rawinda Prajongjai) (f)
 Mixed:  (Tang Chun Man & Tse Ying Suet)
 October 29 – November 3: Macau Open 2019 in 
 Singles:  Sitthikom Thammasin (m) /  Michelle Li (f)
 Doubles:  (Li Junhui & Liu Yuchen) (m) /  (Du Yue & Li Yinhui) (f)
 Mixed:  (Dechapol Puavaranukroh & Sapsiree Taerattanachai)
 November 19 – 24: Korea Masters 2019 in  Seoul
 Singles: (m) / (f)
 Doubles: (m) / (f)
 Mixed: 
 November 26 – December 1: Syed Modi International 2019 in  Lucknow
 Singles:  Wang Tzu-wei (m) /  Carolina Marín (f)
 Doubles:  (He Jiting & Tan Qiang) (m) /  (Baek Ha-na & Jung Kyung-eun) (f)
 Mixed:  (Rodion Alimov & Alina Davletova)

 Level Six (Super 100)
 March 12 – 17: Lingshui China Masters 2019 in  Lingshui Li Autonomous County
 Singles:  Weng Hongyang (m) /  Kim Ga-eun (f)
 Doubles:  (Lee Jhe-huei & Yang Po-hsuan) (m) /  (Baek Ha-na & Kim Hye-rin) (f)
 Mixed:  (Tang Chun Man & Ng Tsz Yau)
 March 19 – 24: 2019 Orleans Masters in  Orléans
 Singles:  Koki Watanabe (m) /  Saena Kawakami (f)
 Doubles:  (Lee Yang & Wang Chi-lin) (m) /  (Chloe Birch & Lauren Smith) (f)
 Mixed:  (Thom Gicquel & Delphine Delrue)
 July 2 – 7: 2019 Canada Open in  Calgary
 Singles:  Li Shifeng (m) /  An Se-young (f)
 Doubles:  (Mathias Boe & Mads Conrad-Petersen) (m) /  (Setyana Mapasa & Gronya Somerville) (f)
 Mixed:  (Ko Sung-hyun & Eom Hye-won)
 July 16 – 21: 2019 Russian Open in  Vladivostok
 Singles:  Shesar Hiren Rhustavito (m) /  Pai Yu-po (f)
 Doubles:  (Mathias Boe & Mads Conrad-Petersen) (m) /  (Ni Ketut Mahadewi Istirani & Tania Oktaviani Kusumah) (f)
 Mixed:  (Adnan Maulana & Mychelle Crhystine Bandaso)
 August 6 – 11: 2019 Hyderabad Open in  Hyderabad
 Singles:  Sourabh Verma (m) /  Yeo Jia Min (f)
 Doubles:  (Muhammad Shohibul Fikri & Bagas Maulana) (m) /  (Baek Ha-na & Jung Kyung-eun) (f)
 Mixed:  (HOO Pang Ron & Cheah Yee See)
 August 13 – 18: 2019 Akita Masters in  Akita
 Singles:  Firman Abdul Kholik (m) /  An Se-young (f)
 Doubles:  (Ou Xuanyi & Zhang Nan) (m) /  (Ayako Sakuramoto & Yukiko Takahata) (f)
 Mixed:  (Ko Sung-hyun & Eom Hye-won)
 September 10 – 15: 2019 Vietnam Open in  Ho Chi Minh City
 Singles:  Sourabh Verma (m) /  ZHANG Yiman (f)
 Doubles:  (Choi Sol-gyu & Seo Seung-jae) (m) /  (Della Destiara Haris & Rizki Amelia Pradipta) (f)
 Mixed:  (GUO Xinwa & ZHANG Shuxian)
 October 1 – 6: 2019 Indonesia Masters in  Malang
 Singles:  Sun Feixiang (m) /  Wang Zhiyi (f)
 Doubles:  (Ou Xuanyi & Zhang Nan) (m) /  (Siti Fadia Silva Ramadhanti & Ribka Sugiarto) (f)
 Mixed:  (GUO Xinwa & ZHANG Shuxian)
 October 8 – 13: 2019 Dutch Open in  Almere
 Singles:  Lakshya Sen (m) /  Wang Zhiyi (f)
 Doubles:  (Vladimir Ivanov & Ivan Sozonov) (m) /  (Gabriela Stoeva & Stefani Stoeva) (f)
 Mixed:  (Robin Tabeling & Selena Piek)
 November 20 – 24: Scottish Open 2019 in  Glasgow
 Singles:  Lakshya Sen (m) /  Qi Xuefei (f)
 Doubles:  (Alexander Dunn & Adam Hall) (m) /  (Amalie Magelund & Freja Ravn) (f)
 Mixed:  (Mathias Christiansen & Alexandra Bøje)

Leagues 

 December 22, 2018 – January 13, 2019: 2018–19 Premier Badminton League in  India.
 The Bengaluru Raptors defeated the Mumbai Rockets, 4–3, to win their maiden Premier Badminton League title.

References

External links
 Badminton World Federation

 
Badminton by year
2019 sport-related lists